Djombo may refer to:

Abkar Djombo, a sub-prefecture of Ouaddaï Region in Chad
Haraze Djombo Kibet, sub-prefecture of Batha Region in Chad
Haraze Djombo Kibit a sub-prefecture of Batha Region in Chad
Henri Djombo (born 1952), Congolese politician
Super Mama Djombo, a band from Guinea Bissau